Deutschmeister may refer to:

 a high dignitary of the Teutonic Knights, Landmeister of the bailiwicks in the Holy Roman Empire, see Teutonic Order#Landmeister
 service members of the Lower Austrian Infantry Regiment No. 4 in the Austro-Hungarian Army
 , a 1955 film by Ernst Marischka starring Romy Schneider

See also
 Deutschmeister-Palais